Campo de Argañán is a subcomarca in the comarca of Comarca de Ciudad Rodrigo in the province of Salamanca, Castile and León.  It contains 15 municipalities: Abusejo, Alba de Yeltes, Aldehuela de Yeltes, Boada, Cabrillas, Castraz, Dios le Guarde, La Fuente de San Esteban, Martín de Yeltes, Morasverdes, Puebla de Yeltes, Retortillo, Sancti-Spíritus, Sepulcro-Hilario and Tenebrón.

References 

Comarcas of the Province of Salamanca